Gustavo Juan Forchetti (born 1 April 1981) is an Argentine footballer who plays in Greece for Egaleo. He began his career at Boca Juniors, before spending the 2003 season on loan at Major League Soccer club MetroStars. He later played for CD Santamarina.

External links
 Juan Forchetti at BDFA.com.ar 
 Player profile at MetroFanatic.com

1981 births
Living people
Sportspeople from Buenos Aires Province
Argentine footballers
Boca Juniors footballers
Chacarita Juniors footballers
New York Red Bulls players
Egaleo F.C. players
Argentine expatriate footballers
Expatriate soccer players in the United States
Major League Soccer players
Association football defenders